Carcassonne is a railway station in Carcassonne, Occitanie, France, on the Bordeaux–Sète and Carcassonne–Rivesaltes lines. The station is served by TGV, Intercités and TER services operated by SNCF.

History
The station built in 1857 by the Railway Company du Midi is located to the north of the ville basse near the Canal du Midi and extended when the Compagnie du Midi opened a second line with the stretch from Carcassonne to Limoux on 15 July 1876, which was extended to Quillan 1 July 1878.

Architecture
The main building is in the classical style and flanked by two wings and a clock.
The station hall is decorated with a fresco (8m x 3m) installed in 1995 the painter Jean Camberoque representing the land of the Aude. The Station Buffet features a mural painted in 1996 representing the actor Philippe Noiret waiting for the train on the station platform.

Train services
The following services currently call at Carcassonne:
High speed services (TGV) Toulouse–Montpellier–Lyon
Intercity services (Intercités) Bordeaux–Toulouse–Montpellier–Marseille
Night services (Intercités) Paris–Narbonne–Cerbère
Regional service (TER Occitanie) Toulouse–Carcassonne–Narbonne
Local service (TER Occitanie) Carcassonne–Limoux

Gallery

References

External links

Timetable search, TER Occitanie

Railway stations in Aude
Railway stations in France opened in 1857